The Sonoma State Seawolves are the athletic teams that represent Sonoma State University, located in Rohnert Park, California, in NCAA Division II intercollegiate sports. The Seawolves compete as members of the California Collegiate Athletic Association for all 13 varsity sports except for women's water polo, which competes in the Western Water Polo Association and men's and women's tennis, which compete in the Pacific West Conference.

History
Three NCAA national championships won by women's soccer in 1990, men's soccer in 2002, and men's golf in 2009 also highlight SSU's athletic achievements. In 2008, the athletics department created the Seawolf Sports Network, allowing home basketball games to be broadcast via streaming video over the internet in an effort to further increase interest in its sports programs.

From the school's opening in 1962 until 2002, the school's teams were known as the Cossacks, a nod to the Russian settlers at Fort Ross. The Cossacks name was deemed offensive because of the group's "fanatical intolerance of non-Christians. Cossack-led pogroms through the ages left hundreds of thousands of Jews and others dead." In November 2000, Sonoma State's academic senate voted 24–3 in favor of renaming the mascot, this time without any reference to a human group. The student senate subsequently passed a nearly identical resolution.

Then-school president Ruben Armiñana formed a "naming committee" composed of students, athletic department members, faculty and others. After many months of surveying thousands of students, staff, faculty and alumni, the group presented Arminana with two possible alternatives—Condors (for California's state bird, which does not live in Sonoma County) and Seawolves, a nod to Sonoma's own Jack London, author of The Sea-Wolf. Armiñana chose the latter.

Individual teams

Baseball
Sonoma State's baseball team is particularly noteworthy with repeated conference championships, 28 players drafted to major league teams since the year 2000, and 68 players drafted since records began in 1975.

Men's soccer
The men's soccer team appeared in the 1991 NCAA Division II Men's Soccer Championship, but lost to Florida Tech. They would later win the championship against Southern New Hampshire University in 2002.

Softball
Sonoma State's softball team has continued to show its relentless fight to be at the top. In the past four seasons Coach Jennifer Bridges has led the softball team to four straight NCAA tournament appearances and a pair of CCAA tournament championships.

Women's volleyball
Sonoma State's volleyball team has come very far to become 16th in the nation for Division II schools. Head coach, Bear Grassl, had received Coach of the Year this last year. The Women's volleyball team is expected to finish third in the CCAA in their 2014 season.

Championships

Appearances
The Sonoma State Seawolves competed in the NCAA Tournament across 13 sports (5 men's and 8 women's) 105 times at the Division II level.

 Baseball (13): 1991, 1992, 1998, 1999, 2001, 2003, 2004, 2007, 2008, 2009, 2011, 2013, 2014
 Men's basketball (7): 1973, 1974, 1989, 1999, 2003, 2006, 2017
 Women's basketball (6): 1998, 1999, 2002, 2004, 2007, 2008
 Women's cross country (1): 2001
 Men's golf (6): 2007, 2008, 2009, 2010, 2011, 2015
 Women's golf (2): 2010, 2015
 Men's soccer (10): 1990, 1991, 1993, 2002, 2005, 2007, 2008, 2009, 2010, 2016
 Women's soccer (14): 1990, 1991, 1992, 1993, 1994, 1995, 1997, 1998, 2000, 2012, 2013, 2015, 2016, 2017
 Softball (11): 1995, 2007, 2009, 2010, 2011, 2012, 2013, 2014, 2015, 2016, 2017
 Men's tennis (6): 2000, 2001, 2006, 2007, 2008, 2010
 Women's tennis (11): 1997, 1998, 1999, 2000, 2001, 2002, 2003, 2004, 2005, 2006, 2007
 Women's outdoor track and field (8): 1984, 1989, 1990, 1996, 1998, 1999, 2000, 2001
 Women's volleyball (10): 1993, 2008, 2009, 2010, 2011, 2012, 2013, 2014, 2015, 2017

Team

The Seawolves of Sonoma State earned 3 NCAA team championships at the Division II level.

 Men's (2)
 Golf: 2009
 Soccer: 2002
 Women's (1)
 Soccer: 1990

Results

Individual

At the Division III level, Sonoma State garnered 1 individual championship.

Club sports
Sonoma State also has a strong club sports program led by lacrosse, 2002 USLIA National champions, rowing, and women's volleyball, the 2018 and 2019 Division II National Champions. In 2008, the Men's Volleyball Club finished as runner-up at the National Championships. In 2010, the Men's Volleyball Club won the division II NIRSA National Championship, and senior setter Scott Fontana was named MVP.

In 2017, Sonoma State Rowing saw success during the Western Intercollegiate Rowing Association. Both the Men's Varsity 8+ and Novice 4+ won gold, competing in the lightweight category.

In 2018, Sonoma State Women's Club Volleyball won the Division II National Championship. Outside hitter Rachel Hadley was named MVP. Right side hitter Bailey Oliver and Libero Becca Steiner were named 1st-team All-Americans, and Setter Samantha Wallace was named All-American Honorable Mention.

In 2019, Sonoma State Women's Club Volleyball won the Division II National Championship, their second title in two years. Outside hitter Rachel Hadley was named MVP for a second year in a row. Right side hitter Bailey Oliver and setter Sam Wallace were named 1st-team All-Americans, and middle blocker Molly Armstrong was named All-American Honorable Mention. Coaches Robert Stamps and Chelsea Reilley were named National Coaches of the Year.

References

External links